Bassett is an unincorporated community in the San Gabriel Valley, in Los Angeles County, California, United States, located within the Census-designated places boundaries of Avocado Heights and West Puente Valley. Located in the San Gabriel Valley, the ZIP Code is 91746 and the community is inside area code 626.

History

Joseph Workman, the son of William Workman, owned  of the Rancho La Puente land, and borrowed money on the property. He was not able to keep up the mortgage payments so the bank acquired the property. In 1895, O.T. Bassett bought the property and Bassett Township was established. In 1921, Josephine (Workman) Akley, the youngest child of Joseph Workman, won a lawsuit to recover an interest in the Rancho La Puente land that her father sold. However, the decision was reversed in 1922.

Education

Bassett Unified School District

Bassett High School

Notable people

 Clyde Beck - (1900-1988) was a right-handed infielder in Major League Baseball for the Chicago Cubs and Cincinnati Reds from 1926 to 1931.

See also

List of Ranchos of California
Ranchos of California

References

External links
Map of old Spanish and Mexican ranchos in Los Angeles County 

Facebook

Communities in the San Gabriel Valley
Puente Hills